11:11 is the debut solo album by American musician Maria Taylor. It was released on May 24, 2005 by Saddle Creek Records. The album was produced by Andy LeMaster and Mike Mogis, who also provide additional musical backing throughout. It features appearances from Conor Oberst of Bright Eyes and Gretta Cohn of Cursive, among others, while one track was written by Taylor's former Little Red Rocket bandmate Louis Schefano.

A music video was released for the track "Song Beneath the Song", directed by Tai Yin Ho. 11:11 was released on vinyl LP for the first time in 2015 for Record Store Day. The album was later reissued by Taylor's own label Flower Moon Records.

"Song Beneath the Song" was included on the first volume of the soundtrack for the television series Grey's Anatomy in 2005, and subsequently became the namesake for a 2011 episode of the series. The song was also featured in the television series One Tree Hill, at the end of 8th episode of the 3rd season.

Track listing
All tracks are written by Maria Taylor, except where noted.

 "Leap Year" – 4:28
 "Song Beneath the Song" – 3:59
 "Two of Those Too" – 4:26
 "Nature Song" (Louis Schefano) – 4:08
 "Lighthouse" – 3:36
 "One for the Shareholder" – 3:26
 "Xanax" – 5:42
 "Birmingham 1982" – 3:32
 "Speak Easy" – 3:31
 "Hitched!" – 2:51

Personnel
Credits are adapted from the album's liner notes.

 Maria Taylor – vocals, acoustic guitar, piano, electric piano, Rhodes piano, drums
 Brad Armstrong – guitar, banjo, mandolin, organ
 Gretta Cohn – cello
 Andrej Curty – violin
 Andy LeMaster – guitar, keyboards, organ, backing vocals, programming, production, mixing, recording
 Mike Mogis (also credited as Digital Audio Engine) – guitar, pedal steel guitar, bass, keyboard bass, mandolin, keyboards, programming, production, mixing, recording
 Conor Oberst – backing vocals
 Kim Salistean – violin
 Macey Taylor – bass
 Jadon Ulrich – layout
 Viktor Uzur – cello
 Doug Van Sloun – mastering

References

External links
 

2005 debut albums
Maria Taylor albums
Albums produced by Andy LeMaster
Albums produced by Mike Mogis
Saddle Creek Records albums